Tribute to a Bad Man is a 1956 American Western film directed by Robert Wise and starring James Cagney about a rancher whose harsh enforcement of frontier justice alienates the woman he loves. It was based on the short story "Hanging's for the Lucky" by Jack Schaefer, the author of Shane.

Plot
Rustlers rob horses belonging to wealthy Wyoming rancher Jeremy Rodock and shoot him. He is found by young cowboy Steve Miller, who digs out the bullet, saves Rodock's life and is offered a job at the ranch.

Rodock believes in lynching rustlers personally without arrest or trial. His wrangler McNulty describes it as "a hanging sickness" to Rodock's woman, Jocasta Constantine, a former dance-hall girl ashamed of her past.

McNulty makes a pass at Jo. A jealous and suspicious Rodock sees them leave a barn together and jumps to the wrong conclusion. He fires McNulty, then beats him viciously before ordering him off the ranch.

Rodock sets out to find the men who stole his stock and murdered Whitey, a ranch hand. He rides to former partner Peterson's spread and demands to know if Peterson and son Lars were involved. They deny it, but Rodock soon comes to believe that Peterson and partners Hearn and Barjak are the thieves. He kills Peterson and hangs Hearn.

Lars vows to avenge his father. He joins up with McNulty and Barjak and plan to steal every horse Rodock owns. Steve is sickened by watching a man hang and Jo urges him to speak with Rodock about his vigilante ways. Steve has fallen in love with her and begs her to leave with him, but she will not.

Valuable horses are stolen and McNulty files down the hoofs into bloody stumps. Rodock catches up to the three thieves, makes them dismount and remove their boots. At gunpoint, he forces them to walk to jail through sand, rock and cactus. Barjak ultimately passes out and McNulty begs for mercy.

Rodock comes to his senses. He lets the other rustlers go and returns Lars to the Peterson ranch, where he offers to make restitution. Upon returning home, he finds that Steve is leaving forever and taking Jo with him. Rodock cannot blame either, but when he rides out to bring her some jewelry she left behind, Jo has a change of heart and stays with Rodock after all.

Cast
 James Cagney as Jeremy Rodock
 Don Dubbins as Steve Miller
 Stephen McNally as McNulty
 Irene Papas as Jocasta Constantine
 Vic Morrow as Lars Peterson
 James Griffith as Barjak
 Onslow Stevens as Hearn
 James Bell as L.A. Peterson
 Jeanette Nolan as Mrs. Peterson
 Lee Van Cleef as Fat Jones

Production
Production began with Spencer Tracy as the star of the film, but he clashed with director Robert Wise and was extremely temperamental causing several delays in  filming. When Tracy claimed that the high altitude of the mountain set was making him ill and insisted that the set be moved to a lower location, he was  finally  dismissed from the film by MGM and replaced by James Cagney. Robert Francis was originally cast in the role of Steve Miller, but he was killed in an airplane crash just before filming began. Francis was replaced by Don Dubbins. Irene Papas  replaced Grace Kelly who turned the film down as did Eva Marie Saint and Jennifer Jones.

Reception
According to MGM accounts the film earned $1,193,000 in the US and Canada and $849,000 elsewhere, resulting in a loss of $1,623,000.

See also
 List of American films of 1956

References

External links
 
 
 
 

1956 films
Films based on short fiction
Films directed by Robert Wise
1956 Western (genre) films
Films scored by Miklós Rózsa
Metro-Goldwyn-Mayer films
American Western (genre) films
CinemaScope films
Revisionist Western (genre) films
1950s English-language films
1950s American films